Molyobka may refer to:
Molyobka (rural locality), name of several rural localities in Russia
Molyobka (river), a river in Perm Krai, Russia